Kamal al-Deen Maitham bin Ali bin Maitham al-Bahrani (1238 – 1299), commonly known as Sheikh Maitham Al Bahrani (also spelt Maytham al-Bahrani) was a leading 13th Century Twelver Eastern Arabian theologian, author and philosopher. Al Bahrani wrote on Twelver doctrine, affirmed free will, the infallibility of prophets and imams, the appointed imamate of `Ali, and the occultation of the Twelfth Imam. Along with Kamal al-Din Ibn Sa’adah al Bahrani, Jamal al-Din ‘Ali ibn Sulayman al-Bahrani, Maytham Al Bahrani was part of a 13th-century Bahrain school of theology that emphasised rationalism.

At the same time, Maytham Al Bahrani was profoundly influenced by the disciplines of philosophy and mysticism. He wrote widely on such theology related philosophical issues as epistemology and ontology.

Al Bahrani's scholarship took in both Imami and Sunni sources; according to University of Bahrain academic, Ali Al Oraibi:

In the 13th Century, Twelvers - particularly mystics. - were a growing influence in Bahrain, which had previously been dominated by the Ismaili Qarmatian sect.
 
The Bahrain school of thought's integration of philosophy and mysticism into Imami Shi'ism had an enduring legacy, influencing fourteenth century theologians such as Ibn Abi Jumhur al-Ahsai'i. Politically, the intellectual vitality of al-Bahrani and his contemporaries is credited with converting the Ilkhanid monarch, Mohammed Khudabandeh, to convert to Shi'ism and announce a Shia state.

He is buried in Mahooz, Bahrain, where a shrine and mosque have been constructed.

See also
History of Bahrain
Abdullah al Samahiji

References

Rival Empires of Trade and Imami Shiism in Eastern Arabia, 1300-1800, Juan Cole, International Journal of Middle East Studies, Vol. 19, No. 2, (May, 1987), pp. 177–203

External links
 Ibn Maisam Bahrani
 Biography (Arabic)

1280 deaths
Year of birth unknown
Bahraini Shia clerics
Twelvers
Medieval Bahraini people
Bahraini Shia Muslims
Bahraini ayatollahs
1238 births